Brookville was a solo project of Andy Chase from Ivy. They released three albums, all on his own label, Unfiltered Records: Wonderfully Nothing (2003), Life in the Shade (2006) and Broken Lights (2009). Brookville toured with Goldfrapp in support of Wonderfully Nothing, and with Tahiti 80 in November 2006.

In November 2012, Brookville changed their name to Camera2, releasing the "Just About Made It" single, followed by EP releases in 2013 and 2014.

References

External links
 Official site

Indie pop groups from New York (state)